Merrill Elam is an American architect and educator based in Atlanta, Georgia. She is a principal with Mack Scogin in Mack Scogin Merrill Elam Architects where their work spans between buildings, interiors, planning, graphics and exhibition design, and research.

Biography and education
She received a Bachelor of Architecture from the Georgia Institute of Technology in 1971 and a Master of Business Administration at the J. Mack Robinson College of Business Georgia State University in 1982.

Career 
She worked as an architect and senior associate at Heery & Heery Architects & Engineers for 12 years prior to establishing Scogin Elam and Bray Architects in 1984. In 2000, Mack Scogin and Merrill Elam Architects was established. She has been a licensed architect in 13 states, a member of the American Institute of Architects and is NCARB certified.

In addition to an active practice, she  has been a visiting architecture professor in architecture programs across the country including Harvard University, Yale University, University of Toronto, University of Virginia, Ohio State University, Syracuse University, and University of Texas at Austin.  She also formerly acted as president of the Georgia State Board of Architects. In addition she aided in founding the Architecture Society of Atlanta and is the former organization's former president.

Selected projects
The Round House, Connecticut, 2020 
One Midtown Plaza Lobby, Atlanta, Georgia, 2007
Health Services Center, Yale University, New Haven, Connecticut, 2006
Ernie Davis Hall, Syracuse University, Syracuse, New York, 2005
Gates Center for Computer Science and Hillman Center for Future Generation Technologies, Carnegie Mellon University, Pittsburgh, Pennsylvania, 2005
Zhongkai Sheshan Villas, Shanghai, China, 2004
Carroll A. Campbell Jr. Graduate Engineering Center, Clemson University, Clemson, South Carolina, 2004
U.S. Federal Courthouse, General Services Administration, Austin, Texas, 2003
Lulu Chow Wang Campus Center and Davis Garage, Wellesley College, Wellesley, Massachusetts, 2001
Carol Cobb Turner Branch Library, Marrow, Georgia, 1991
John J. Ross - William C. Blakley Law Library, Arizona State University, Tempe, Arizona, 1993
Austin E. Knowlton School of Architecture, Ohio State University, Columbus, Ohio, 1998
Jean Gray Hargrove Music Library, University of California, Berkeley, Berkeley, California, 1998
Mountain Tree House, Dillard, Georgia, 1998

Honors and awards
2014 Design Leader award, Women in Architecture Awards, Architectural Record, 2014
Shutze Medal, Georgia Institute of Technology with Mack Scogin, 2013
Cooper-Hewitt National Design Award for Architecture with Mack Scogin, 2012 
Arnold W. Brunner Memorial Prize in Architecture, American Academy of Arts and Letters with Mack Scogin, 2011
Royal Institute of British Architects, International Fellow, 2008
Chrysler Award for Innovation in Design with Mack Scogin, 1996
Arts and Letters Award in Architecture, American Academy of Arts and Letters with Mack Scogin, 1995

References

External links
Mack Scogin Merrill Elam Architects
International Archive of Women in Architecture, https://web.archive.org/web/20151023163207/http://lumiere.lib.vt.edu/iawa_db/view_all.php3?person_pk=278&region=&table=bio&cSel=

21st-century American architects
American women architects
Living people
20th-century American architects
Architects from Atlanta
Georgia Tech alumni
Georgia State University alumni
Harvard Graduate School of Design faculty
Yale University faculty
Academic staff of the University of Toronto
University of Virginia faculty
Ohio State University faculty
Syracuse University faculty
University of Texas at Austin faculty
Year of birth missing (living people)
20th-century American women
American women academics
21st-century American women